Janusz Olejniczak (born 2 October 1952 in Wrocław) is a Polish classical pianist and actor.

Career
Olejniczak began playing piano at the age of six. He studied under Luiza Walewska, Ryszard Bakst and Zbigniew Drzewiecki in Warsaw and Łódź. In 1970, he placed sixth in the VIII International Chopin Piano Competition in Warsaw, and two years later he placed fourth in the Alfredo Casella Piano Competition in Naples. From 1971 to 1973, he studied in Paris under Constantine Schmaeling and Witold Małcużyński, and returned to Poland thereafter to study in the Higher State School of Music in Warsaw under Barbara Hesse-Bukowska. He completed his post-graduate studies from 1977 to 1978 in Essen under Victor Merzhanov and Paul Badura-Skoda.

Olejniczak was a member of a chamber orchestra, and his repertory includes compositions of Beethoven, Schumann, Schubert, Chopin, Ravel, and Prokofiev. He has recorded often for radio and television as well as on compact disc for labels such as Polskie Nagrania, Selene, Pony Canyon, Opus 111 and CD Accord. Among his awards are five Fryderyks and numerous awards for his recordings of the Chopin piano concertos with the Warsaw Symphony Orchestra.

Olejniczak taught classes for four years at the Academy of Music in Kraków, has held master's classes in Poland, Canada, the United States, and Japan, and has sat on judging panels of international piano competitions.

Acting career
In addition to performing the composer's music, he portrayed Chopin, in Andrzej Żuławski's film The Blue Note, He also performs the music in Roman Polanski's  film The Pianist, also appearing as the hand double for Adrien Brody, who portrays pianist Władysław Szpilman.

References

External links
Janusz Olejniczak at Culture.pl
Janusz Olejniczak's Official Website

Polish classical pianists
Male classical pianists
Polish male film actors
Living people
1952 births
Prize-winners of the International Chopin Piano Competition
Academic staff of the Academy of Music in Kraków